The Avenue Marceau is an avenue in Paris, France, marking the boundary between its 8th and 16th arrondissements.

History
Named after General François Séverin Marceau (1769–1796), it runs from Avenue du Président-Wilson (almost parallel with the Place de l'Alma) to Place Charles de Gaulle. It was originally decreed on 13 August 1854 and only ran between the Rue Circulaire and then-Place de l'Étoile before being extended as far as Avenue de l'Empereur by decree of 6 March 1858.

It was named Avenue Joséphine after Joséphine de Beauharnais by the 1858 decree before being given its present name by another decree of 16 August 1879, which also renamed Rue de Wattignies the existing Rue Marceau in the 12th arrondissement.

References

Streets in the 8th arrondissement of Paris
Streets in the 16th arrondissement of Paris